Loughbracken Fort is a motte and National Monument located in County Meath, Ireland.

Location

Description
Loughbracken Fort is a circular flat-topped mound defined by a fosse.

References

Archaeological sites in County Meath
National Monuments in County Meath